Doris Bačić (born 23 February 1995) is a Croatian professional footballer who plays as a goalkeeper who plays for Spanish Liga F club FC Levante Las Planas, having previously played for FC Rosengård of the Swedish Damallsvenskan, RSC Anderlecht, Juventus FC and Sporting CP.

Bačić starred for the Croatia women's national football team in a 3–0 defeat to England at Bescot Stadium, Walsall, in September 2012. She subsequently signed for Arsenal Ladies in summer 2013. Bačić was restricted to training and playing in friendly matches because she was not granted a work permit.

Bačić was unhappy at Arsenal and described the club as arrogant. By January 2014 she had quit London and embarked on a trial at Swedish Damallsvenskan champions FC Rosengård.

In July 2016 Bačić left SFK 2000 for German Frauen-Bundesliga outfit SC Sand, but reverted to SFK 2000 the following month. She then spent the 2017 season playing for Einherji of the Icelandic third division. In 2017–18 she represented Super League Vrouwenvoetbal title winners RSC Anderlecht, securing four clean sheets in her six appearances.

Honours 
Juventus
 Serie A:  2018–19, 2019–20, 2020–21
 Coppa Italia: 2018–19
 Supercoppa Italiana: 2019, 2020–21

References

External links
 
 
 

1995 births
Living people
Croatian women's footballers
Croatia women's international footballers
Arsenal W.F.C. players
Women's Super League players
Croatian expatriate sportspeople in England
Expatriate women's footballers in England
FC Rosengård players
Damallsvenskan players
Expatriate women's footballers in Sweden
Croatian expatriate sportspeople in Sweden
Croatian expatriate women's footballers
Croatian expatriate sportspeople in Spain
Expatriate women's footballers in Belgium
Expatriate women's footballers in Iceland
Expatriate women's footballers in Italy
Expatriate women's footballers in Germany
SC Sand players
Juventus F.C. (women) players
Croats of Bosnia and Herzegovina
Women's association football goalkeepers
Doris Bačić
Super League Vrouwenvoetbal players
RSC Anderlecht (women) players
Serie A (women's football) players
ŽNK Osijek players
Croatian expatriate sportspeople in Germany
Croatian expatriate sportspeople in Iceland